William "Bill" McKenna (born August 29, 1946) is an American Democratic politician who served in the Missouri Senate and the Missouri House of Representatives from 1983 to 1993.

Biography 
Born in St. Louis, Missouri, McKenna graduated from St. Louis University High School and earned a Bachelor of Arts degree in education from Southeast Missouri State University. He served in the United States Army Reserve from 1968 until 1974.

His son Ryan McKenna also served in the Missouri Senate and the Missouri House of Representatives, while his father J. Glennon McKenna served in the Missouri House of Representatives in the 1940s.

References

1946 births
20th-century American politicians
Democratic Party members of the Missouri House of Representatives
Democratic Party Missouri state senators
Southeast Missouri State University alumni
Living people